The 2013 Eritrean Army mutiny was mounted on 21 January 2013, when around 100-200 soldiers of the Eritrean Army in the capital city, Asmara seized the headquarters of the state broadcaster, EriTV, and allegedly broadcast a message demanding reforms and the release of political prisoners. The mutiny was the first major incident of resistance to the rule of Isaias Afwerki since the purging of a group of fifteen ministers who demanded political reform in 2001. Details about the mutiny remain murky, with several (but not all) government officials denying it even took place, while opposition sources claimed it had been an abortive coup attempt.

Background

Eritrea has been ruled by Isaias Afwerki since its independence in 1993 from Ethiopia, following a 30-year war for independence. Initially allied with Ethiopian Prime Minister Meles Zenawi and his Tigray People's Liberation Front, whom Isaias' Eritrean People's Liberation Front had helped overthrow the communist regime of Mengistu Haile Mariam, border disputes caused relations between the two nations to rapidly turn sour, and in May 1998, Ethiopia invaded Eritrea. The resultant conflict killed between 70,000-100,000 on both sides, and left Eritrea with over a third of its territory occupied and over 650,000 people displaced. Although Eritrea was awarded most of the disputed territory by the Permanent Court of Arbitration, Ethiopia, until 2018, still occupied most of the disputed land.

The war caused a severe curtailment of political freedoms and rights in Eritrea, with the constitution's implementation being delayed indefinitely and most young people being forced into indefinite national service. Presidential and parliamentary elections were postponed and have never been held since independence. The People's Front for Democracy and Justice, nominally a transitional authority, is the sole legal political organisation, making Eritrea Africa's last remaining official one-party state and the only non-communist one-party state in the world (most African nations were at one point single party states, while all its neighbours, Sudan, Ethiopia, and Djibouti have dominant-party systems).

Religious activity has been strictly monitored and suppressed, with evangelicals in particular facing imprisonment and torture. Even the patriarch of the majority Eritrean Orthodox Tewahedo Church, Abune Antonios, was in 2007 forcibly removed and placed under house arrest. The level of repression has prompted many to call it "the North Korea of Africa" – Eritrea, which has no private media, has been ranked last in Reporters Without Borders' Press Freedom Index since 2007, below North Korea.

The mutiny
Early on January 21, the soldiers surrounded the headquarters of the state broadcaster, EriTV, known as "Forto", which sits atop a small hill overlooking Asmara. The soldiers stormed the building and gathered all the employees into a room, and forced the director of EriTV, Asmelash Abraha, to read a prepared statement demanding the restoration of the constitution, the release of political prisoners, and the freeing of captured refugees. Only after Asemlash had read two sentences, the feed was cut off and the building surrounded by loyal soldiers, who also took up defensive positions around the presidential palace and airport, with the city remaining mainly calm.  The soldiers were purportedly led by Col. Saleh Osman, a hero of Eritrean War of Independence.

At 10pm, the broadcast resumed, and the station's employees were released. The soldiers were said to have withdrawn from the headquarters complex.

Reaction
Iranian media outlet, Press TV, interviewed Tesfa-Michael Gerahtu, Eritrean Ambassador to the United Kingdom, who claimed that the attempt had been fabricated, and that there had been no unrest whatsoever. There is also controversy in the name of the kind of action led by these rebel militaries. The Permanent Representative to the African Union and the United Nations Economic Commission for Africa (UNECA), Ambassador Girma Asmerom claimed that  "As is the case all over the world an armed crazy, stupid and terrorist individual or group can take stupid actions... Such isolated incidents which frequently occur in the West are considered terrorist acts. I don't understand why in Africa they are considered coups d'état. It is the highest form of double standard and hypocrisy," thus implying that there had been unrest.

References

2013 in Eritrea
2013 in military history
21st-century rebellions
Military history of Eritrea
Mutinies
Political history of Eritrea
January 2013 events in Africa
History of Asmara